Anarmodia is a genus of moths of the family Crambidae.

Species
Anarmodia arcadiusalis Schaus, 1924
Anarmodia bistralis (Guenée, 1854)
Anarmodia corylalis (Guenée, 1854)
Anarmodia damalis (Guenée, 1854)
Anarmodia elongalis Schaus, 1924
Anarmodia flaccidalis (Snellen, 1892)
Anarmodia glaucescens Hampson, 1918
Anarmodia inferioralis (Guenée, 1854)
Anarmodia inflexalis (Snellen, 1892)
Anarmodia inscriptalis (Guenée, 1854)
Anarmodia lojalis Schaus, 1924
Anarmodia majoralis (Guenée, 1854)
Anarmodia nebulosalis Dognin, 1903
Anarmodia obliqualis Hampson, 1913
Anarmodia pallidicostalis Dognin, 1903
Anarmodia perfulvalis Dognin, 1903
Anarmodia polystriata Hampson, 1913
Anarmodia punctilinealis Hampson, 1899
Anarmodia remotalis Dognin, 1903
Anarmodia remusalis (Walker, 1859)
Anarmodia repandalis Schaus, 1924
Anarmodia salviusalis Schaus, 1924
Anarmodia sibilalis (Guenée, 1854)
Anarmodia tesselliferalis Hampson, 1918

References

Spilomelinae
Crambidae genera
Taxa named by Julius Lederer